Zavedeniye is a rural locality (a village) in Sylvenskoye Rural Settlement, Permsky District, Perm Krai, Russia. The population was 4 as of 2010.

Geography 
Zavedeniye is located 32 km east of Perm (the district's administrative centre) by road. Sylva is the nearest rural locality.

References 

Rural localities in Permsky District